The Assateague Beach Coast Guard Station is a former facility of the United States Coast Guard. It is located on Toms Cove, a sheltered area on the west side of the southern end of Assateague Island, in the Assateague Island National Seashore. The station was first built in 1874, facing out toward the ocean. In 1922, due to shifting topography, it was relocated to face Toms Cove, with a new Colonial Revival station house; the old boathouse was converted into a garage in 1938–39. The station was formally decommissioned in 1967 and turned over to the National Park Service as part of the new National Seashore.

The former station was listed on the National Register of Historic Places in 2015.

See also
National Register of Historic Places listings in Accomack County, Virginia
List of United States Coast Guard stations

References 

Buildings and structures in Accomack County, Virginia
United States Coast Guard stations
Colonial Revival architecture in Virginia
Military installations established in 1922
Assateague Island
1922 establishments in Virginia